The W. H. York Round Barn, also known as Thompson Barn, is a historic round barn located on Country Road 249 (CR-249) a half mile south of Lodi, in Liberty Township, Parke County, Indiana.  It was built about 1895, and is a two-level wood-frame structure on a brick foundation.  The barn measures 56 feet in diameter. It has a conical roof topped by a circular cupola.

It was listed on the National Register of Historic Places in 1993.

See also
 List of Registered Historic Places in Indiana
 Parke County Covered Bridges
 Parke County Covered Bridge Festival

References

Round barns in Indiana
Barns on the National Register of Historic Places in Indiana
Buildings and structures in Parke County, Indiana
Infrastructure completed in 1895
National Register of Historic Places in Parke County, Indiana